The 2009–10 season is the eighth season in FC Vaslui's existence, and its fifth in a row in Liga I. Having finished in the top six last season, FC Vaslui is qualified for the Third qualifying round in Europa League.

Pre-season
On 16 June, FC Vaslui's officials confirmed that the team will have a cantonment in Gogh, Germany, where will play 6 friendly games, against  VfR Fischeln, FC Eindhoven, Ankaraspor A.Ş., Alemannia Aachen, Fortuna Düsseldorf and Gaziantepspor. FC Vaslui's first transfer, Farul's Willian Gerlem was confirmed by Adrian Porumboiu for 600.000 € on 22 June. It was also confirmed that Ioan Sdrobiş will be second team's technical manager. On 25 June, António Semedo confirmed that he will sign a 2-year contract with FC Vaslui. Also, on 25 June, Daniel Munteanu was released by the club because of his poor performance against FC Brașov, in the previous season. On 15 July, FC Vaslui signed a one-year contract sponsorship with New Holland, and will receive 1 million €. The contract could extend for another year, if FC Vaslui will have a long European season. On 22 July, FC Vaslui obtained a one-year loan for Constantin Gângioveanu from Universitatea Craiova.

Friendly matches

First-team squad

 T=Total
 L=Liga I
 C=Cupa României
 I=UEFA Europa League, Intertoto UEFA Cup

Second-team squad

Transfers

Summer

In

Out

Winter

In

Out

Statistics

Appearances and goals
Last updated on 22 May 2010.

|-
|colspan="12"|Players sold or loaned out during the season
|-

|-
|colspan="12"|Statistics of the FC Vaslui players playing for another team
|-

|}

Top scorers

Disciplinary record

Overall

{|class="wikitable"
|-
|Games played || 44 (34 Liga I, 4 UEFA Europa League, 6 Cupa României)
|-
|Games won || 24 (18 Liga I, 2 UEFA Europa League, 4 Cupa României)
|-
|Games drawn ||  10 (8 Liga I, 1 UEFA Europa League, 1 Cupa României)
|-
|Games lost || 10 (8 Liga I, 1 UEFA Europa League, 1 Cupa României)
|-
|Goals scored || 60
|-
|Goals conceded || 34
|-
|Goal difference || +26
|-
|Yellow cards || 105
|-
|Red cards || 3
|-
|Worst discipline ||  Miloš Pavlović with 15 yellow cards and 1 red card
|-
|Best result || 5-0 (A) v Chimia Brazi – Cupa României – 23 Sep 2009
|-
|Worst result || 0-3 (A) v AEK Athens – Europa League – 27 Aug 2009
|-
|Most appearances ||  Wesley with 41 appearances
|-
|Top scorer ||  Wesley (17 goals)
|-
|Points || 62/102 (60.7%)
|-

Performances
Updated to games played on 26 May 2010.

Goal minutes
Updated to games played on 22 May 2010.

International appearances

Notes
 Stanislav Genchev was called for Bulgaria, but was not capped.

Records

Comeback
FC Vaslui have conceded the first goal in a match 14 times this season in the Liga I, Cupa României and the Europa League,  recorded 4 wins, 1 draw and 9 losses.

Liga I

League table

Results summary

Results by round

Matches

Liga I

UEFA Europa League

3rd Qualifying Round

Play-off

Cupa României

FC Vaslui seasons
Vaslui